Nan-e berenji, also called shirini berenji, is an Iranian rice-flour cookie originating from Kermanshah. Nan-e berenji literally translates to "rice bread". It is often flavored with cardamom, garnished with poppy seeds and formed into flat disks. They are usually white, but sometimes tinted yellow.

Seven Sweets 
According to legend, King Jamshid discovered sugar on the Persian new year, Nowruz. Therefore, there is the custom to celebrate Nowruz with seven sweet foods, in addition to the traditional other 7 foods at the Haft-sin. The seven sweets are:

 noghl, sugar-coated almonds
 Persian baklava, pistachio almond pastry
 nan-e berenji, rice cookies
 nan-e badami, almond cookies
 nan-e nokhodchi, chick-pea cookies
 sohan asali, honey almonds
 nan-e gerdui, walnut cookies

The history of Nan-e Berenji 
Nan-e berenji dates back 150 years ago during the Qajar period. Travelers and pilgrims to and from Kermanshah on the Silk Road were looking for specific food which would last longer and also contain nutrients. In response, locals made sweets with rice, which was the leading food of the travelers.

References

External links 

Iranian desserts
Nut dishes